Bang Si-hyuk (born August 9, 1972), known professionally as "Hitman" Bang (stylized as "hitman" bang), is a South Korean lyricist, composer, producer, and record executive. He is the founder of Big Hit Music (formerly Big Hit Entertainment) and Hybe Corporation, and chairman of the latter.

One of the fifty richest people in South Korea according to Forbes Asia, Bang is the only billionaire in the South Korean entertainment industry. As of July 2021, he is reportedly worth an estimated $3.2 billion, according to the Bloomberg Billionaires Index.

Early life
Bang Si-hyuk was born to Bang Geuk-yoon, former president of the Korea Workers' Compensation and Welfare Corporation at the Korea Social Insurance Research Institute, and his wife, Choi Myung-ja. He has a younger sister. His cousin, Bang Jun-hyuk, is the founder of Netmarble, South Korea's largest mobile-gaming company, while his maternal uncle, politician and former journalist Choi Kyu-sik, was appointed as the South Korean ambassador to Hungary in 2018.

Bang developed a passion for music from an early age, having grown up in a musical home, but was discouraged from pursuing a career in the industry by his parents. He formed a band with friends while in middle school and began writing and performing songs he had composed. Bang attended Kyunggi High School before graduating from Seoul National University with a degree in aesthetics.

Career
Bang debuted as a composer while in college. He met Park Jin-young during the mid-1990s, and the pair often partnered together as a songwriting duo. When Park founded his company JYP Entertainment, Bang joined him as a composer, arranger and producer. One of their early successes was the first-generation group g.o.d. They were largely responsible for the production of g.o.d's debut album Chapter 1, with Park serving as the producer and primary songwriter while Bang arranged the instrumentation and music. Some of g.o.d's most famous songs arranged by Bang include "One Candle" and "Road". Bang's stage name "Hitman" originated from this period, when g.o.d enjoyed success as one of the country's best-selling and most popular boy bands of the early 2000s, earning himself and Park a reputation as "hit makers". Besides g.o.d, Bang has produced or composed for many other artists, including veterans Im Chang-jung and Park Ji-yoon, singer-actor Rain, groups Wonder Girls, 2AM, and Teen Top, and R&B singer Baek Ji-young.

In 2005, Bang left JYP and founded his own company, Big Hit Entertainment, where he continued to write, compose and produce for its artists. Under the Big Hit label, he signed up RM, at age 15, who would go on to lead the boy band BTS. Bang believes that a singer is a performer first and that singing their own songs is not necessary for an artist to achieve good results. He co-wrote six songs for BTS in their 2016 album Wings. Its success garnered Bang the Best Producer Award at the Mnet Asian Music Awards and the Songwriter Award at the Melon Music Awards that year. In June 2018, he was named one of Variety's International Music Leaders due to BTS' achievements.

In April 2019, Bloomberg estimated Bang's worth to be about $770 million. The BigHit IPO filed in October 2020 was the largest seen in South Korea in three years and skyrocketed Bang's net worth to $2.8 billion, making him the only billionaire in South Korea's entertainment industry and the sixth-richest person in the country. The success of the IPO, together with the commercial success of BTS that year, Bang's steps into diversification with apps like Weverse, and acquisitions of companies like Source Music and Pledis Entertainment among others, landed him on the 2020 edition of Varietys Variety500, an annual index of the 500 most influential business leaders in the global media industry.

In June 2021, Forbes Asia published its annual list of Korea's 50 Richest People. One of only two newcomers to the ranking, Bang was listed as the 16th richest person in South Korea. On July 1, following an organizational restructuring, Hybe Corporation announced Bang's resignation as CEO of the company to return his focus to music production. He was replaced by Park Ji-won, but retained his position as Chairman of the Board of Directors. According to the Bloomberg Billionaires Index, Bang is worth an estimated $3.2 billion as of July 2021.

Bang was featured on the cover of the April 2022 issue of Time magazine, together with BTS, following the release of the outlet's annual list of the 100 Most Influential Companies in March—Hybe was included on the list for a second consecutive year and topped the "Leaders" category. Later that month, he received an honorary doctorate in Business from Seoul National University (SNU)—he is the first figure in the entertainment industry to be awarded such—in recognition of his "contribution to the development and innovation of the nation's cultural and entertainment industry" and for his "role in turning K-pop into a global pop music culture".

Philanthropy 
In October 2022, Bang donated 5 billion won (approximately $3.5 million) to the Community Chest of Korea.

On February 17, 2023, Bang donated 200 million won to help 2023 Turkey–Syria earthquake, by donating money through Save the Children.

Production discography

Lyrics and composition

Recognition

Awards

Listicles

References

1972 births
Living people
Seoul National University alumni
South Korean composers
South Korean chief executives
South Korean music industry executives
South Korean music managers
South Korean record producers
Namyang Bang clan
Melon Music Award winners
Kyunggi High School alumni
Hybe Corporation